Aldergrove Star is a newspaper in Aldergrove, British Columbia. The original title of the paper was Aldergrove Herald and it was started on 16 October 1957. From then on the paper was renamed many times: Aldergrove News (27 February 1958 – 30 April 1964); Central Fraser Valley Echo (6 May 1964 – 23 December 1964) and Central Valley Star (17 January 1967 – 5 February 1969). In 1969 the title of the paper was made Aldergrove Star.  

Rudy and Inge Langmann acquired the paper in September 1966. As of 2020 the editor was Ryan Uytdewilligen.

See also
List of newspapers in Canada

References

External links
Aldergrove Star – Official website.

1957 establishments in British Columbia
Black Press
Publications established in 1957
Weekly newspapers published in British Columbia